This table displays the top-rated primetime television series of the 1999–2000 season as measured by Nielsen Media Research.

References

1999 in American television
2000 in American television
1999-related lists
2000-related lists
Lists of American television series